The Sottens Transmitter  is the nationwide transmitter for French-speaking Switzerland. The transmitter is located at Sottens, Canton of Vaud, Switzerland. It is run on 765 kHz with a power of 600 kilowatts and is easily receivable during the night throughout the whole of Europe. Since 1989 the aerial used has been a centre-fed dipole fixed on the outside of a 188-metre-high grounded freestanding steel framework tower. Before 1989 a 190-metre high self-radiating, free standing steel framework tower was used as a transmission aerial.
The Sottens transmitter most recently broadcast the Option Musique radio programme from Radio Suisse Romande, up until 5 December 2010.

There is also a 125 metre tall free-standing lattice tower on the site. This tower was built in 1931 as one of a pair, which until 1958 carried between them a T-antenna for medium wave broadcasting. The second tower was dismantled in that year and rebuilt in Dole as a TV transmission tower. This tower is insulated from ground to form a tower radiator and is used as backup antenna.

After the shutdown of RSR on MW, the antenna was later used for ham radio experiments in February 2011, using both standard AM and DRM in the 80 m band.

See also
 Lattice tower

External links
 Sottens transmitter pictures on emetteurs.ch
 
 http://www.skyscraperpage.com/diagrams/?b44084
 http://www.skyscraperpage.com/diagrams/?b57952
 The Sottens transmitter Retrieved 26 January 2006
 Sottens transmitter Sottens

Lattice towers
Towers in Switzerland
Buildings and structures in the canton of Vaud
Broadcast transmitters
1931 establishments in Switzerland
Towers completed in 1931
20th-century architecture in Switzerland